2,4,6-Trinitrobenzoic acid (TNBA) is an organic compound with the formula (O2N)3C6H2CO2H.  It is a high explosive nitrated derivative of benzoic acid.

Preparation and reactions
2,4,6-Trinitrobenzoic acid is prepared by oxidation of 2,4,6-trinitrotoluene (TNT). It is formed by oxidation of TNT and nitric acid with chlorate and with dichromate.

Upon heating, 2,4,6-trinitrobenzoic acid undergoes decarboxylation to give 1,3,5-trinitrobenzene.  Reduction with tin gives 2,4,6-triaminobenzenoic acid, a precursor to phloroglucinol (1,3,5-trihydroxybenzene).

References 

Explosive chemicals
Benzoic acids